Banksia leptophylla var. leptophylla is a variety of Banksia leptophylla. It is native to the Southwest Botanical Province of Western Australia. As an autonym, it is defined as containing the type specimen of the species.

References
 
 
 

leptophylla var. leptophylla
Eudicots of Western Australia